Killabite may refer to:

 Killabite (Rob Jarvis song), song from the 2002 album On the Road (Miss Kittin album)
 Killabite (Killabite song), song from the 1999 Richie Hawtin album Decks, EFX & 909

See also
 Killabyte, a fictional character from the children's CG animated TV show ReBoot
 Kilobyte (kB) 1000 bytes
 Kibibyte (KiB) 1024 bytes
 Kilobit (kb) 103 bits
 Kibibit (Kib) 210 bits
 Kilobyte (disambiguation)
 Killa (disambiguation)
 Bite (disambiguation)